The  is a railway line of Hankyu Railway in Hyōgo Prefecture, Japan, connecting Tsukaguchi Station in the city of Amagasaki and Itami Station in the city of Itami. It extends .

History
The line opened, electrified at 600 VDC in 1920, and duplicated in 1943. The voltage was raised to 1500 VDC in 1967.

The Itami station building collapsed during the Great Hanshin earthquake in 1995, and a temporary station opened 400m south of the original station three months later while the original station was torn down and rebuilt. A single track was restored to the rebuilt station site in 1998, and dual track service resumed in 1999.

Stations
All trains of the Itami Line stop at all four stations (including both ends).
All stations are in Hyōgo Prefecture

References
This article incorporates material from the corresponding article in the Japanese Wikipedia

Itami Line
Itami Line
Rail transport in Hyōgo Prefecture
Railway lines opened in 1920